Canadian values are the commonly shared ethical and human values of Canadians. The major political parties generally claim explicitly that they uphold these values, but there are no consensus among them about what they are and follow a value pluralism approach.

Canada ranks among the highest in international measurements of government transparency, civil liberties, quality of life, economic freedom, education and  gender equality. Canadian Government policies—such as publicly funded health care; higher and more progressive taxation; outlawing capital punishment; strong efforts to eliminate poverty; an emphasis on cultural diversity; strict gun control;  the legalization of same-sex marriage, pregnancy terminations, euthanasia and cannabis — are social indicators of the country's political and cultural values.  Canadians identify with the country's institutions of health care, military peacekeeping,  the national park system  and the Canadian Charter of Rights and Freedoms.

Numerous scholars have tried to identify, measure and compare them with other countries. Baer et al. argue that "Questions of national character and regional culture have long been of interest to both Canadian and American social scientists. The Canadian literature has focussed largely on historical and structural reasons for regional distinctiveness and the possible role of regionalism in undermining a truly national Canadian character or ethos."

International comparisons

When he began his study of Canada in the late 1940s, American sociologist Seymour Martin Lipset assumed Canadian and American values were practically identical. Further work led him to discover and to explore the  differences. By 1968 he concluded:
Canadian values fall somewhere between those of Britain and the United States, rather than being almost identical with those of the United States, as I had assumed.

Lipset offered some theories of where the two societies differ, and why. That stimulated a large body of scholarship, with other scholars offering their own explanations and criticizing his. As a result, numerous academic studies compare Canadian values and beliefs with those of the United States, and sometimes they add in other countries as well. Lipset has explained his social science methodology:
my conclusions [are] that the variations in North American history and social and geographic environments gave rise to two peoples who differ in significant ways from each other, although as I have repeatedly stressed, they are more similar than different, particularly in comparison with other nations. My chief methodological argument for focusing on Canada in order to learn about the United States is precisely that the two nations have so much in common. Focusing on small differences between countries which are alike can be more fruitful for understanding cultural effects than on large ones among highly similar nations. The former permits holding constant many variables, which the units have in common.

Lipset presented numerous political and economic values on which he scored the U.S. as high and Canada as low. These included: individualism and competitiveness, entrepreneurship and high risk-taking, Utopian moralism, inclination to political crusades, populist or anti-establishment and anti-elite tendencies, a God-and-country nationalism, and intolerance for ideological nonconformity.

Historical origins: Revolution and counterrevolution
Lipset argues that:
Many writers seeking to account for value differences between the United States and Canada suggest that they stem in large part from the revolutionary origins of the United States and the counterrevolutionary history of Canada…. The Loyalist emigrés from the American Revolution and Canada's subsequent repeatedly aroused fears of United States encroachment fostered the institutionalization of a counterrevolutionary or conservative ethos.<ref>S.M. Lipset, Revolution and Counterrevolution: Change and persistence in social structures (2nd ed, 1970) p. 55.</ref>
Canadian historian Arthur R. M. Lower argues:
 In its new wilderness home and its new aspect of British North Americanism, colonial Toryism made its second attempt to erect on American soil a copy of the English social edifice. From one point of view this is the most significant thing about the Loyalist movement; it withdrew a class concept of life from the south, moved it up north, and gave it a second chance.

Jean Chrétien in his 2010 book My Years as Prime Minister stated the country is fundamentally western and liberal, and the values of nation as "moderation, sharing, tolerance and compassion.” Some critics undermine him as a "plain-speaking politician [who] built his career on defending traditional Canadian values and promoting middle-class policies."

Justin Trudeau after taking office as Prime Minister in 2015 tried to define what it means to be Canadian, saying that Canada lacks a core identity but does have shared values: 

There is no core identity, no mainstream in Canada.... There are shared values—openness, respect, compassion, willingness to work hard, to be there for each other, to search for equality and justice. Those qualities are what make us the first post-national state.

Some critics observe that Trudeau's list of values are an evolving one as political circumstances arise, and the idea of post-nationalism by stripping Canada's European History is a pavement to tribalism and race based politics to cement stakeholder groups and appeal to them during elections, and others undermine him as a political eunuch.

Religious factors

Religious belief and behaviour are possible candidates in searching for the sources of values. Lipset looked to religion as one of the causes of differing values. He stated:

America remains under the strong influence of the Protestant sects. Its northern neighbor adheres to two churches, Catholic and Anglican, and an ecumenical Protestant denomination (the United Church of Canada) that has moved far from the sectarian origins of its component units toward churchlike communitarian values. The overwhelming majority of Canadians (eighty-seven percent) belong to these three mainline denominations. Conservative evangelicals--groups of Baptists, Nazarenes, Pentecostals, Adventists, and so on--constitute only seven percent of Canadians....Clearly, the different religious traditions of the two countries help to explain much of their varying secular behavior and belief.

Hoover and Reimer agree and update Lipset with a plethora of recent survey statistics, while noting that the differences narrowed since 1990, especially in the Prairie provinces. They stress that in the early 21st century 87% of Canadians belonged to cooperative churches, whereas 20% of Americans were Baptists and many more were evangelicals, fundamentalists or members of new religions who tended to behave in a more sectarian fashion; these elements, they argue, made for a higher level of religious and political conservatism and intolerance in the U.S.

Regionalism
Baer, Grabb and Johnston argue that:
The pattern of regional cultures is not significantly affected or defined by the national border separating Canada and the United States. Instead...with a few exceptions, the map of regional cultures involves three major segments: a relatively left-liberal Quebec, a more conservative Southern United States, and a comparatively moderate sector that largely encompasses the remainder of the two countries.

Description
A 2013 Statistics Canada survey found that an "overwhelming majority" of Canadians shared the values of human rights (with 92% of respondents agreeing that they are a shared Canadian value), respect for the law (92%) and gender equality (91%). There was considerably less agreement among Canadians over whether ethnic and cultural diversity, linguistic duality, and respect for aboriginal culture were also shared Canadian values.

According to the Canadian Index of Well Being at the University of Waterloo, Canadian values include:

 fairness
 inclusion
 democracy
 economic security
 safety
 sustainability
 diversity
 equity
 health

A survey for Citizen's Forum on Canada's Future, 1991 identified the following values:

 Equality and fairness
 Consultation and dialogue
 Accommodation and tolerance
 Diversity
 Patriotism
 Freedom, Peace and Nonviolent change.

Lydia Miljan, a political scientist expressed that core canadian values include “self reliance, limited government, and what are often labelled traditional family values.”

Eric Kaufmann, a Vancouver-raised political scientist at the University of London, said politician's should not force their biases as the accepted version of culture or values for their own purposes instead they should highlight “core values around respect for liberty, law and celebrating major historical episodes.”

Monarchy

Michael Ignatieff, the Liberal leader in 2009–11, in 2004 rooted Canadian values in a historic loyalty to the Crown. Likewise the Conservative Party in 2009 pointed to support for the monarchy of Canada as a core Canadian value.

Shaping foreign policy
John Diefenbaker, the Conservative Prime Minister 1957–63, was reluctant to use Canadian values as a criterion for deciding on foreign policies. For example, Jason Zorbas argues that human rights abuses in Argentina and Brazil did not affect relations with those countries.

However his successor, Lester Pearson, the Liberal Prime Minister (1963–68), called in 1967 for a foreign policy "based on Canadian considerations, Canadian values and Canadian interests."

Under Conservative Brian Mulroney, Prime Minister 1984–1993, according to scholar Edward Akuffo:
Canadian foreign policy witnessed the integration of development and security issues and the foreign policy agenda when Canada participated in development projects as well as in peacekeeping operations.... Mulroney's policy initiatives... [marked] the critical juncture for the revamping of 'Canada's moral identity' after the Cold War.... The concept of Canada's moral identity is consistent with what others call the 'branding of Canada' in the international arena through the projection of Canadian values and culture.

Stephen Harper, Prime Minister (2006–2015), tried to shift the existing foreign policy concerns to one were Canada's self-reliance and self-responsibility are prioritized. During 147th Canada Day convention, he said Canada's characteristics and values lie in by being a confident partner, a courageous warrior, and a compassionate neighbour.

Egalitarianism, social equality, and peace
While Liberal and Conservative politicians claimed to represent Canadian values, so too did socialists and forces on the left. Ian MacKay argues that, thanks to the long-term political impact of "Rebels, Reds, and Radicals", and allied leftist political elements, "egalitarianism, social equality, and peace... are now often simply referred to... as 'Canadian values.'"

Education

Contrasted to the United States, historical educational ideals in Canada have been more elitist, with an emphasis on training church and political elites along British lines.Craig Crawford and James Curtis. "English Canadian-American differences in value orientations: Survey comparisons bearing on Lipset's thesis." Studies in Comparative International Development 14.3-4 (1979): 23-44. In 1960, for example, 9.2 percent of Canadians aged 20 to 24 were enrolled in higher education, compared to 30.2 percent in the United States. Even at the secondary level, enrolments were higher in the United States. According to surveys in the late 1950s of citizens and educators by Lawrence Downey:

Canadians, as a group, assigned considerably higher priority than did Americans to knowledge, scholarly attitudes, creative skills, aesthetic appreciation, and morality, as outcomes of schooling. Americans emphasized physical development, citizenship, patriotism, social skills, and family living much more than did Canadians.

The United States has long emphasized vocational, technical and professional education, while the Canadian schools resist their inclusion. Ivor F. Goodson and Ian R. Dowbiggin have explored the battle over vocational education in London, Ontario, in the 1900–1930 era, a time when American cities were rapidly expanding their vocational offerings. The London Technical and Commercial High School came under heavy attack from the city's social and business elite, who saw the school as a threat to the budget of the city's only academic high school, London Collegiate Institute.

Public universities
Most post-secondary institutions in Canada are public universities, which means they are funded by the provincial governments but not owned by the provinces. In contrast, public universities in the United States are owned and controlled by state governments, and there are many private universities, including such schools as Harvard, Yale, Princeton, Chicago and Stanford.

Canadian Charter of Rights and Freedoms

The Canadian Charter of Rights and Freedoms, heavily promoted by Prime Minister Pierre Trudeau, was adopted in 1982. The Charter guarantees certain political rights to Canadian citizens and civil rights of everyone in Canada from the policies and actions of all areas and levels of the government. It is designed to unify Canadians around a set of principles that embody those rights. Even before he entered politics, Trudeau had developed his concept of the charter primarily as an expression of common Canadian values. Trudeau said that, thanks to the Charter, Canada itself could now be defined:
Canada is a society where all people are equal and where they share some fundamental values based upon freedom. The search for this Canadian identity, as much as my philosophical views, had led me to insist on the charter.

As Professor Alan Cairns noted about the  Canadian Charter of Rights and Freedoms  , "the initial federal government premise was on developing a pan-Canadian identity"'. Pierre Trudeau himself later wrote in his Memoirs (1993) that "Canada itself" could now be defined as a "society where all people are equal and where they share some fundamental values based upon freedom", and that all Canadians could identify with the values of liberty and equality.

Multiculturalism

The enormous ethnic variety of the population of Canada in recent decades has led to an emphasis on "multiculturalism." Sociologist N. M. Sussman says, "The tenets of this concept permitted and subtly encouraged the private maintenance of ethnic values while simultaneously insisting on minimal public adherence to Canadian behaviours and to Canadian values." As result, immigrants to Canada are more likely to maintain the values and attitudes of both the home and of the host culture, compared to similar immigrants to Australia, the United Kingdom, or the United States.

Andrew Griffith argues that "89 percent of Canadians believe that foreign-born Canadians are just as likely to be good citizens as those born in Canada.... But Canadians clearly view multiculturalism in an integrative sense, with an expectation that new arrivals will adopt Canadian values and attitudes." Griffith adds that "There are virtually no differences between Canadian-born and foreign-born with respect to agreement to abide by Canadian values (70 and 68 percent, respectively)."

Gender equality and the role of women
In 2016, the workforce participation rate for Canadian women was 70.2% (78.4% for males).

Some believe that Elsie MacGill defined Canadian values. She was a pioneer for women in engineering and business, a war hero and a role model.

Section 15 of the Canadian Charter of Rights and Freedoms prohibits discrimination on the basis of sex.

In contrast, in the United States the Equal Rights Amendment was never ratified. Section 1 of that amendment would have granted "Equality of rights under the law shall not be denied or abridged by the United States or by any State on account of sex."

Citing Canadian values, Canadian courts have rejected assertions that violence against women is in some circumstances acceptable because of one's religious and cultural beliefs. In the R v. Humaid decision, Justice Rutherford of the Ontario Superior Court of Justice stated:

Wife-murder may seem especially repugnant to our Canadian value fabric when cultural considerations that are contrary to our Canadian values figure prominently. However it must be borne in mind here that the Court of Appeal found "no air of reality" to the applicant's claim that religious and cultural beliefs resulted in his being severely provoked by what his wife said to him.

Publicly funded health care

Universal access to publicly funded health services "is often considered by Canadians as a fundamental value that ensures national health care insurance for everyone wherever they live in the country." Survey research in the 1990s showed that:
When asked, "What makes you most proud of Canada?" one in three Canadians volunteered, "Our health-care system." When asked a reversed version of the American health-care scenario, "Would you support political union [with the U.S.] if it meant a private health-care system?" The reply was a resounding "no."

Invocation
Memorials
The idea of Canadian values has been used for the dedication of memorials, like the Memorial to the Victims of Communism: Canada, a Land of Refuge, in Ottawa. It construction was meant to bring the suffering of "the millions of victims of Communism" into the public's consciousness. Many of these victims fled to Canada "seeking peace, order, democracy, and liberty."  The memorial is expected to be completed in 2018.

According to Ms. Mélanie Joly, the Minister of Canadian Heritage, "Commemorative monuments play a key role in reflecting the character, identity, history and values of Canadians". She complained that the previous Harper government had made the project too controversial. Her new Liberal government has moved the site and cut its budget.

Quebec
Charter of the French Language
The Charter of the French Language (French: , also known as  [Bill 101]) is legislation that makes French the official language of Quebec. Among other things, the Charter requires:

 all administrative government documents to be drafted and published in French
 the language of instruction from kindergarten to secondary school to be French

Quebec Charter of Values
It would have banned public sector employees from wearing conspicuous religious symbols. Article 5 in Chapter II stated:

In the exercise of their functions, personnel members of public bodies must not wear objects such as headgear, clothing, jewellery or other adornments which, by their conspicuous nature, overtly indicate a religious affiliation.

Though Justin Trudeau has been a champion of the Canadian Charter of Rights and Freedoms, he opposed the proposed Quebec Charter of Values.  He stated, "Prohibiting someone from wearing a hijab or a kippah is not compatible with Quebec and Canadian values." Bill 60 was less prominent and of no value during COVID-19.

Distinct society
Proposed changes to the Canadian Constitution included adding the phrase "distinct society" to the Constitution Act, 1867, to recognize the uniqueness of Quebec as compared with the rest of Canada.Richard Johnston and Andre Blais. "Meech Lake and Mass Politics: The'Distinct Society'Clause." Canadian Public Policy/Analyse de Politiques (1988): S25-S42. online

Controversy
Defining Canadian values is problematic if the goal is to identify values that are universally held. According to Canadian Broadcasting Corporation reporter Neil Macdonald, there are "precious few notions that can accurately be described as universally held Canadian values." According to journalist Lysiane Gagnon, Canadians "don't share common values." She notes that, while many ideas—such as medicare, bilingualism, and multiculturalism—are sometimes characterized as Canadian values, "many Canadians are against all or some of these." Canadian sociologist Vic Satzewich has argued that "coming up with a universal set of our nation's values would be impossible."

The Institute for Canadian Values sponsored advertisements against the teaching of certain sexual education topics in the Ontario school curriculum and discriminated against transsexual, transgender, and intersex persons. The advertisements were controversial and quickly discontinued.

 Barbaric cultural practices issue
Certain cultural practices were called "Barbaric" and made illegal in 2015, when the Zero Tolerance for Barbaric Cultural Practices Act was enacted by the Canadian federal government. The Act criminalizes certain conduct related to early and forced marriage ceremonies, as well as removing a child from Canada for the purpose of such marriages.

In the 2015 general election Conservatives had pitched their policy "as an issue of Canadian values.... The Conservatives expanded the issue, announcing a proposed RCMP hotline that would allow Canadians to report the existence of 'barbaric cultural practices' in the country." These targeted practices included polygamy, forced marriage and early marriage (i.e. child marriage).

Nationalism and its potential adverse impact on foreign policy

Scholars have asked whether shared values underpin national identity. Denis Stairs links the concept of Canadian values with nationalism. Stairs, the McCulloch Professor in Political Science at Dalhousie University, has argued that there is indeed an intense widespread belief in the existence of Canadian values, but says that belief can itself be harmful. He contends that:
[Canadians typically] think of themselves not as others are, but as morally superior. They believe, in particular, that they subscribe to a distinctive set of values—Canadian values—and that those values are special in the sense of being unusually virtuous. A prominent effect of that belief is that it has put them in serious danger of misunderstanding the true origins of their behaviour, on the one hand, and of doing significant damage to the effectiveness of their diplomacy, both next door and overseas, on the other.

Stairs also argues that, "first billing is usually given in received lists of Canadian values to 'multiculturalism'... as a means of challenging the premises of nationalism in Quebec."

Screening immigrants for anti-Canadian values
Canadian politicians have proposed rejecting immigrants who have anti-Canadian values such as:

 intolerance toward other religions, cultures, genders, and sexual orientations
 reluctance to embrace Canadian freedoms

Kellie Leitch, a candidate for leadership candidate for the Conservative Party of Canada's 2017 Convention, was a vocal proponent of such government screening.

In 2016, an Environics public opinion poll found that 54 per cent of Canadians agree that "there are too many immigrants coming into this country who are not adopting Canadian values."

See also

 Anti-Canadian sentiment
 Canadian identity
 Center for Research-Action on Race Relations
English Canadians
Etiquette in North America
French Canadians
 Just society
Civic nationalism
 Western culture

 References 

Further reading

 Alston, Jon P., Theresa M. Morris, and Arnold Vedlitz. "Comparing Canadian and American values: New evidence from national surveys." American Review of Canadian Studies 26.3 (1996): 301-314.
 Baer, Doug, et al. "The values of Canadians and Americans: A critical analysis and reassessment." Social Forces 68.3 (1990): 693-713.
 Baer, Douglas, Edward Grabb, and William Johnston. "National character, regional culture, and the values of Canadians and Americans." Canadian Review of Sociology/Revue canadienne de sociologie 30.1 (1993): 13-36.
 Baer, Douglas, et al. "Respect for authority in Canada, the United States, Great Britain and Australia." Sociological Focus 28.2 (1995): 177-195.
 Basil, Debra Z. "Charitable donations as a reflection of national values: An exploratory comparison of Canada and the United States." Journal of Nonprofit & Public Sector Marketing 18.1 (2007): 1-19.
 Hoover, Dennis R., and Samuel H. Reimer. "Things That Make for a Peaceable Kingdom: An Overview of Christianity and 'Cooperativeness' across the Continental Divide." Journal of Ecumenical Studies 41.2 (2004): 205+ online
 Hoover,  Dennis R. et al. "Evangelical Protestantism Meets the Continental Divide: Moral and Economic Conservatism in the United States and Canada," Political Research Quarterly 55#3 (June, 2002): 351-374.
  Lipset, S.M. Continental divide: The values and institutions of the United States and Canada  (1991).
 Ivan Katchanovski, Neil Nevitte, and Stanley Rothman. "Race, Gender, and Affirmative Action Attitudes in American and Canadian Universities." The Canadian Journal of Higher Education 45.4 (2015): 18.
 Moon, C. David, Nicholas P. Lovrich Jr, and John C. Pierce. "Political culture in Canada and the United States: comparing social trust, self-esteem, and political liberalism in major Canadian and American Cities." Social science quarterly'' (2000): 826-836. in jSTOR

External links
 Canadian Index of Well Being - University of Waterloo
Exploring Canadian values - Nanos Research

Values
Values
Values